Helcystogramma imagitrijunctum is a moth in the family Gelechiidae. It was described by Hou-Hun Li and Hui Zhen in 2011. It is found in Taiwan and the Chinese provinces of Guizhou, Jiangxi and Zhejiang.

The wingspan is 11–14 mm. The forewings are yellow to greyish yellow, with scattered greyish-brown scales. The costal margin is dark brown, except for the distal quarter. There is a dark brown fascia from the costal two-thirds to the dorsal two-fifths, as well as black scale tufts at the middle of the cell and at the middle of the fold, two black scale tufts at the end of the cell and a broad dark brown fascia terminally. The hindwings are greyish white to grey.

Etymology
The species name refers to the similarity of the species to Helcystogramma trijunctum and is derived from the name of this species and Latin prefix imag - (meaning similar).

References

Moths described in 2011
imagitrijunctum
Moths of Asia
Moths of Taiwan